Adrian Cruciat and Daniel Muñoz-de la Nava were the defending champions, but only Cruciat partnered up with Adrian Ungur, but they lost to Luczak and Sirianni in the first round.
David Martin and Simon Stadler won in the final 6–3, 6–2, against Peter Luczak and Joseph Sirianni.

Seeds

Draw

Draw

References
 Main Draw

Open Prevadies - Doubles
2009 Doubles